BeyWarriors: BeyRaiderz is an anime series, a spin-off of the series Beyblade. While it has been produced in Japan, it has yet to be aired in Japanese. BeyRaiderz has been commissioned by Nelvana to act as a solo series consisting of 13-episodes. The series was originally announced as BeyRaiderz: Shogun, but has since been renamed BeyWarriors: BeyRaiderz. The series acts as a continuation to BeyWheelz as it continues to follow the story of Sho, Jin, and Leon.

Plot
In an unknown land, six guardian beasts provide protection and help cities to thrive through battles called BeyRaiderz. An unknown evil arises to take on the six guardian figures, forcing the six to unite. At the end of the battle the land is protected, but the guardians fall into a slumber. This allows many natural disasters to occur, causing the land to lose its beauty and the people to forget about BeyRaiderz battles. As the six guardian beasts begin to awaken, they call on six BeyWarriors from other lands. The six BeyWarriors are each given BeyRaiderz and charged with going from coliseum arena to coliseum arena to battle. Battling enough times will allow the spirits to reawaken, and it can't happen soon enough as the same darkness that caused them to unite is reawakening and threatens to destroy the world once more.

Characters

Main characters
Sho Tenma is the protagonist of the show. He is a light-hearted and friendly person and is the first BeyWarrior that Rachel and Jimmy meet. Sho always looks at the bright side and might appear a little carefree, but in battles his true, seemingly endless potential comes to the surface. He is voiced by Christopher Jacot.
Jin Ryu is Sho's best friend. He is a silent and level-headed character who has a strong sense of sportsmanship. He takes everything very seriously and functions as a voice of reason for his friends.  Jin also possesses the ability to break through solid rock. He is voiced by Austin Di Iulio.
Leon Fierce is the last of Sho's original friends. He appears rough and a little rude, but once you get to know him he turns out to be a very caring person. Leon has a bad temper that tends to get in his way, but despite that he has a unique way of treating others. He tends to be a good mentor but is also the last one to trust someone. He is voiced by Zachary Bennett.
Armes Navy is a BeyWarrior like Sho and his friends. Not much is currently known about Armes, but he doesn't appear to take friendship easily and seems to be a loner. He is voiced by Terry McGurrin.
Ricky Gills is a very outgoing person. He's always the first one to look for a way to help someone in trouble, and he wants to be everyone's friend. He seems a little gullible to the forces of darkness. He is voiced by Scott Gorman.
Task Landau is a man who is constantly watching Sho and his friends. He is the last of the chosen BeyRaiderz, but his main mission is to evaluate each individuals strengths for the mysterious Kaiser Gray. He is voiced by Ryan Cooley.

Supporting characters
Rachel Cruz is a young girl who has a mysterious compass mirror that guides her to each coliseum and allows her to see if a mythic beast BeyRaiderz is near. She is later revealed to be a descendant of Tempest, but is not a villain and only seeks to undo her ancestor's wrongdoings. She is voiced by Shannon Hamilton.
Jimmy Cruz is Rachel's little brother. He knows of the legend of the six mythic beasts and believes they will bring prosperity back to the land. He is a good cook and joins Rachel along her journey to help guide the six BeyRaiderz back to full strength. He is later revealed to be a descendant of Tempest, but like his sister, he is not a villain. He is voiced by Jacob Ewaniuk.
Kaiser Gray/Flame first appears in the series as an eyeball. He has sent Task out to evaluate each BeyRaiderz individual strengths. He is later revealed to be the Hero Flame, who was given immortality by the Mythic Beasts and allowed to live in the Sacred Garden with them. After defeating Tempest and stopping his quest to take over the world, he was put to sleep just like the Mythic Beasts. When they are resurrected, he too is resurrected, but also mysteriously becomes corrupted. He is voiced by Brian Froud.
Tempest is a legendary blader who was defeated by the Hero Flame shortly before the Mythic Beasts went to sleep. It is stated that his misdeeds had caused great misfortune to his family. He only appears in flashbacks throughout the series and is later revealed to be the ancestor of Rachel and Jimmy Cruz, who are seeking to undo Tempest's wrongdoings. He is voiced by Dan Petronijevic.

Other characters
Domani is a young digger who finds lost artifacts depicting the six legendary beasts. He is the first boy that Sho meets in the new world. He is voiced by Cory Doran. He is seen in episodes 1, 12, and 13. 
Klaus is one of Domani's friends. He's the one who found the tunnel where they hide their artifacts that leads to the first cities coliseum arena. He is voiced by Nathaniel Stephenson. He is seen in episodes 1 and 13. 
Morgen is Domani's other friend that tries to trick Sho into traps in the first city. He is voiced by James Hartnett. He is seen in episodes 1 and 13. 
Holly is a young girl who has lost her grandmother in the forest near an old city. Only she and her grandmother live in the region. She is found and is protected by Jin until her grandmother can be found. She is voiced by Sophia Ewaniuk. Her appearance is in episode 3. 
Grandmother is Holly's grandmother in the forest. While out gathering some herbs she falls off the path and gets separated from Holly. She tries to reunite with Holly, but a sprained ankle keeps her from walking. She is voiced by Jane Luk. Her appearance is in episode 3. 
The Narrator retells the action of the previous episode and also voices the next time preview. He is also voiced by Dan Petronijevic. While the narrator is voiced by the same voice actor who acted as Blader DJ in the Beyblade Metal Saga, it is NOT Blader DJ that provides the recaps for each episode.
Treasure Hunter Bison is one of the four adults shown in this series. He is searching for hidden treasure by traveling from region to region. He believes the treasure he seeks will lead the world, and more importantly himself, to prosperity. He isn't afraid to set up traps to keep his prey from finding the treasure he seeks. Little does he realize all he has come across are battle arenas and that his biggest aid will be in helping the BeyWarriors awaken their beasts. He appears in episodes 5,12 and 13.
Atsushi is a young man that asks Jin to teach him to break boulders. While Jin does refuse his request, he does teach Atsushi a valuable lesson about true strength. He appears in episodes 6, 12, and 13. 
Moot, Raizon, and Andre are three young boys that are best friends. They appear in episodes 8 and 13 of the series. The three boys have left their home village due to famine and drought, but they promised each other they would return in one years time to help dig a well and make the village successful again. When they return none of them has succeeded with their dreams. Now the BeyWarriors must help them realize telling the truth and trying with all your strength is the best way to be successful, even if it means a lot of hard work is in store.

Episode list
All, but episode 4, premiered on YTV in Canada. Cartoon Network acted as the premiere station for episode 4 after airing a 4-episode marathon January 25. However CN began airing the series in its normal slot of 8 AM with episode 1 on February 1 while YTV premiered episode 5 that day, allowing YTV to act as the premiere station for all but episode 4. As YTV airs the English version of the dub, the First English Air Dates listed are for the YTV airings.

References

External links

 

Animated television series about children
Beyblade
Japanese children's animated action television series
Japanese children's animated science fantasy television series
Japanese children's animated sports television series
YTV (Canadian TV channel) original programming